The 2011–12 Bahrain First Division League is the 55th edition of top-level football in Bahrain. Al-Muharraq are the defending champions. The season started on 1 December after numerous postponements to the original fixture list and finished on 4 June with the relegation/promotion playoff match.

Teams

The 2010–11 league campaign was heavily disrupted by the Bahraini uprising in February and a number of games were cancelled or awarded to the opposition team. As it became clear that the league would struggle to continue with the number of postponements, it appeared that Al-Shabab and Malkiya either withdrew from the championship or suspended from the championship which resulted in automatic relegation.

These relegated clubs were replaced by East Riffa Club, returning after one season away from the top flight and Bahrain Club who return for the first time since the 2008–09 Bahrain Classification Soccer League season.

Stadia and locations

Although most clubs do have a stadium, most are played at the National Stadium. Games are usually played as back to back headers.

League table

Promotion/relegation play-off

Fixtures and results

Bahraini Premier League seasons
1
Bah